Sloviansk (or ) is a city in Donetsk Oblast, Ukraine. It is located in the north of the region, in the valley of the Kazennyi Torets River, a right-tributary of the Donets. The city was previously known as Tor until 1784. Sloviansk had a population of  but during the 2022 Russian invasion of Ukraine, the population had shrunk to around 24,000 by July 2022, according to Ukrainian authorities.

Sloviansk was one of the focal points in the early stages of the War in Donbas, in 2014, as it was the first city to be seized and controlled by Russian-backed separatists, in mid-April, until they retreated three months later. Since then, the city has been under Ukrainian control.

History

The history of Sloviansk dates back to 1645 when Russian Tsar Alexei Romanov founded a border fortress named Tor against the Crimean attacks and slave raids on the southern suburbs of modern Ukraine and Russia. In 1664, a first salt plant for the extraction of salt was built, and workers settled in the area. In 1676, a fortress named Tor was built at the confluence of the Kazenyy Torets and Sukhyy Torets River, where they form the Torets River, a tributary of Donets River. Shortly thereafter, the town of Tor grew up next to the fortress.

As several salt lakes were located close by, the town became a producer of salt. During the sixteenth century, salt production was the principal local industry. During the eighteenth century, it became unprofitable and salt production ceased in 1782.

In 1784, the city was renamed Sloviansk. It became a part of the Kharkov Governorate of the Russian Empire in 1797. A resort was established on the shores of Lake Ropne in 1832.

In April 1918, troops loyal to the Ukrainian People's Republic took control of Sloviansk.

The city was occupied by the Germans on 28 October 1941. In December 1941, the SS Einsatzkommando 4b executed more than a thousand Jews who lived in Sloviansk. The Red Army temporarily expelled the Nazi occupiers on 17 February 1943. Germans retook it on 1 March 1943. The Red Army retook Sloviansk on 6 September 1943.

2014 clashes 

On 12 April 2014, during the ongoing crisis following the 2014 Ukrainian revolution, gunmen armed with Kalashnikov assault rifles captured the executive committee building, the police department, and the SBU office in Sloviansk. Ukrainian Interior Minister Arsen Avakov described the gunmen as "terrorists" and vowed to use the Ukrainian special forces to retake the building.

On 13 April 2014, there were reports of fighting between the gunmen and Ukrainian troops, with casualties reported on both sides. The BBC's David Stern described the pro-Russian forces as carrying Russian weapons and resembling the soldiers that took over Crimean installations at the start of the 2014 Crimean crisis.

On 29 May 2014, a Ukrainian helicopter carrying fourteen Ukrainian special service soldiers, including General Serhiy Kulchytskiy – the head of combat and special training for Ukraine's National Guard, crashed after being shot down by militants near Sloviansk. Ukraine's outgoing President Olexander Turchynov described the downing as a "terrorist attack," and blamed pro-Russian militants.

Sloviansk was held by Russian-backed separatists for nearly three months, from mid-April until 5 July 2014. In June the Ukrainian army started moving in, and under heavy pressure, the Russian-backed separatists retreated from Sloviansk in early July, most going to Donetsk. Since then, Sloviansk has remained in Ukrainian control.

In 2015, a plaque to the memory of Volodymyr Rybak, a Ukrainian politician killed by pro-Russian separatists in 2014, was placed in the town center.

2022 Russian Invasion of Ukraine 

In the 2022 Invasion of Ukraine, Sloviansk has been a key city on the eastern front, as part of the second phase of the war, following the Russian retreat from Kyiv. In Spring of 2022, Russian forces seized the strategic town of Izyum and used it as a staging post to attack Sloviansk, to the south. The city of Slovyansk is thought to be critical to Moscow’s objective of capturing all of eastern Ukraine due to its west-central location in the Donbas "pocket" of remaining Ukrainian forces.  On 4 July, The Guardian reported that after the fall of the Luhansk oblast, that Russian invasion troops would press on into the adjacent Donetsk oblast to attack the cities of Sloviansk and Bakhmut.

However, in early September 2022, Ukraine began a major counteroffensive, regaining several settlements in the Kharkiv region. This relieved the pressure on Sloviansk with the recapture of Lyman by Ukrainian forces on 1 October 2022.

Demographics
According to the 2001 Ukrainian Census:

Total population: 141,066

Climate
The climate in Sloviansk is a mild to warm summer subtype (Köppen: Dfb) of the humid continental climate.

Economy

The principal industry of the city concerns machine building: 
 The Slovvazhmash heavy-machinery production plant which produces chemical equipment for coke production and use for the businesses in Lipetsk, Kemerovo and Cherepovets. Companies in Mariupol, Kryvyi Rih, Donetsk, and Kamianske use their products.
 The Betonmash machine-building factory which produces concrete mixing plants, spare parts for mining equipment and metal works, parts for coke ovens. The factory provides foundry services for companies across Donetsk Oblast, Kharkiv Oblast, and Dnipropetrovsk Oblast.
 The Sloviansk mechanical plant which employs approximately four hundred people. It produces chemical equipment for coke production as well as overhead cranes and other machinery.
 The Artem Armature-insulator factory.
 A factory producing high-voltage insulators for hydroelectric power stations and thermal power-stations.

Sloviansk is an important health resort, providing spa treatments and mud baths using mud from the bottom of salt lakes located nearby.

Administration 
Sloviansk served as the administrative center of the Sloviansk Raion (district) until its abolition on 18 July 2020, though it did not belong to the raion.

Transport 

Sloviansk is a nexus of a number of railways and roads. There are three railway stations currently in use, one defunct. Three railway lines leave the city in directions of Lozova, Lyman and Kramatorsk.

Ukrainian international highway  goes by the edge of Sloviansk. The national highway N-20 leaves from the city toward Mariupol. The local population is served by a trolleybus network consisting of two permanent routes and one summer route. Marshrutkas are widely used.

Religious organizations

Christian churches: 
 Cathedral of New Martyrs and Confessors of the Russian Orthodox Church
 Church of the Resurrection of Christ
 Church of the Andrew the Apostle
 Church of Oleksandr Nevskyi
 Church of Seraphim Sarovsky
  The "Kind New" Christian Center Church
  Church of Jesus Christ of the Protestant Church of Ukraine

Notable people
 Mykhaylo Sokolovsky, a Soviet footballer, record holder of the games played for Shakhtar Donetsk
 Maksym Marchenko, Ukrainian colonel, current governor of Odesa Oblast

See also 
 Murder of Pentecostals in Slaviansk

References

External links

  Official website
  Unofficial website of Slavjansk Trolleybus system
 Marble sculpture of Nicolai Shmatko

 
Cities in Donetsk Oblast
Izyumsky Uyezd
Populated places established in 1645
Populated places established in 1676
Articles containing video clips
Cities of regional significance in Ukraine
1676 establishments in Ukraine
Holocaust locations in Ukraine
Cities and towns built in the Sloboda Ukraine
Populated places established in the 17th century
Kramatorsk Raion